Bobby F. (Bob) England (born May 13, 1932) was a  Democratic member of the North Carolina General Assembly representing the state's one hundred twelfth House district, including constituents in Cleveland and Rutherford counties.  He was born in Spindale, North Carolina. A physician and United States Air Force veteran from Ellenboro, North Carolina, England is currently (2009-2010 session) serving in his fourth term in the state House.

In 2009, England was credited with helping to save the life of fellow Rep. Becky Carney, who suffered cardiac arrest at the state legislative building.

References

External links

Democratic Party members of the North Carolina House of Representatives
Living people
21st-century American politicians
1932 births
People from Spindale, North Carolina